Adrienne Adams (February 10, 1906 – December 3, 2002) was a children's book illustrator as well as an artist and writer of children's books. She won two Caldecott Honors (in 1960 and 1962) and in 1973 she was awarded the Rutgers Award for overall contributions to children’s literature. In 1977, she was awarded the University of Southern Mississippi Medallion.

Life and career
Adams was born in Fort Smith, Arkansas, and grew up in Oklahoma. She obtained a B.A. at Stephens College (which awarded her the Alumnae Achievement Award in 1964) and then attended the University of Missouri. She also was awarded the University of Southern Mississippi's Medallion in 1977.

She moved to New York in 1929 to study at the American School of Design and until 1949 she was a free-lance designer of displays, murals, textiles, greeting cards, etc. She married children's book writer John Lonzo Anderson in 1935 and in 1942 illustrated one of his books, Bag of Smoke, to begin her career as an illustrator. She became a full-time illustrator in 1952, and all told she illustrated more than 30 books, ranging from contemporary authors like Rumer Godden, Irwin Shapiro and Aileen Fisher to the fairy tales of Hans Christian Andersen and the Brothers Grimm. Adams also wrote six children books of her own as well as self-illustrated these books.

Selected works 
By other writers
 1954 – Impunity Jane: The Story of a Pocket Doll by Rumer Godden (Viking Press)
 1957 – Mouse House by Godden (Viking)
1957 – The Easter Bunny That Overslept by Priscilla and Otto Friedrich (Lothrop, Lee & Shepard)
 1958 – The Story of Holly and Ivy by Godden (Viking)
1959 – Houses from the Sea by Alice E. Goudey (Charles Scribner's Sons) – one runner-up for the 1960 Caldecott Medal
1960 – The Shoemaker and the Elves by the Brothers Grimm (Scribner's) – ALA Notable Book
1961 – The Day We Saw the Sun Come Up by Alice E. Goudey (Scribner's) – one runner-up for the 1962 Caldecott Medal
1961 – Thumbelina by Hans Christian Andersen (Scribner's) – ALA Notable Book
1963 – Bring a Torch, Jeannette, Isabella by W. Saboly (Scribner's) – ALA Notable Book
1964 – Snow-White and Rose-Red by Grimm (Scribner's)
1968 – Jorinde and Joringel by Grimm (Scribner's) – ALA Notable Book
1973 – Twice Upon a Time by Irwin Shapiro (Xerox Family Education) 
1975 – Hansel and Gretel by Grimm (Scribner's)
1977 – The River Bank from The Wind in the Willows by Kenneth Grahame (Scribner's)
1983 – The Easter Bunny That Overslept by Priscilla and Otto Friedrich (Lothrop, Lee & Shepard) – revised (see 1957)

Self-illustrated
Library of Congress catalogs five children's picture books with text and illustrations by Adams.
 1971 – A Woggle of Witches (Charles Scribner's Sons)
 1976 – The Easter Egg Artists (Scribner's)
 1978 – The Christmas Party (The Scribner Book Company)
 1980 – The Great Valentine's Day Balloon Race (Scribner)
 1981 – A Halloween Happening (Scribner)

Sources
Something About the Author, vol. 8, pp. 1–2.
Illustrators of Children's Books: 1957-1966, 1968, pp. 70–71.
Contemporary Authors: New Revision Series, vol. 1, pp. 9–10.

References

External links
Adrienne Adams Papers at the University of Minnesota
  (including 1 "from old catalog")
 Adrienne Adams Papers, Special Collections at the University of Southern Mississippi (de Grummond Children's Literature Collection)

1906 births
2002 deaths
American children's book illustrators
People from Fort Smith, Arkansas
Artists from Oklahoma
Stephens College alumni
University of Missouri alumni
American women illustrators
20th-century American women artists
20th-century American people